is a mountain located on the border of three cities in Aichi Prefecture, Toyokawa, Okazaki, and Shinshiro.

Hongu